North Korea competed at the 2014 Summer Youth Olympics, in Nanjing, China from 16 August to 28 August 2014.

Medalists

Rowing

North Korea qualified one boat based on its performance at the Asian Qualification Regatta.

Qualification Legend: FA=Final A (medal); FB=Final B (non-medal); FC=Final C (non-medal); FD=Final D (non-medal); SA/B=Semifinals A/B; SC/D=Semifinals C/D; R=Repechage

Weightlifting

North Korea qualified 1 quota in the boys' events and 2 quotas in the girls' events based on the team ranking after the 2013 Weightlifting Youth World Championships.

Boys

Girls

Wrestling

North Korea qualified two athletes based on its performance at the 2014 Asian Cadet Championships.

Boys

Girls

References

2014 in North Korean sport
Nations at the 2014 Summer Youth Olympics
North Korea at the Youth Olympics